Costignophos is a genus of moth in the family Geometridae.

Selected species

Costignophos avilarius
Costignophos crenulata
Costignophos italohelveticus
Costignophos pullata

References
Natural History Museum Lepidoptera genus database

Gnophini
Geometridae genera